"Rude Boy" is a 1964 Bob Marley song. One of his earliest songs and singles, it was included by Clement Dodd in the first The Wailers album Wailing Wailers, 1965. The anthem placed The Wailers at the head of the rude boy music culture. The song integrates vocal harmonizing with social commentary.

References

Songs about youth subcultures
1964 songs
Bob Marley songs
Songs written by Bob Marley
Song recordings produced by Coxsone Dodd